Force protection (FP) refers to the concept of protecting military personnel, family members, civilians, facilities, equipment and operations from threats or hazards in order to preserve operational effectiveness and contribute to mission success. It is used as a doctrine by members of NATO.

The concept of force protection was initially created after the Beirut barrack bombings in Lebanon in 1983. With its Cold War focus toward potential adversaries employing large conventional military forces at the time (e.g., the Soviet Union, etc.), the U.S. military had become complacent and predictable with regard to asymmetric attacks by state and non-state actors employing terrorist and guerilla methodologies .  As a result, during what were ostensibly peacekeeping operations by a U.S. Marine Corps landing force ashore in Lebanon in 1983, it allowed two civilian trucks to breach the perimeter of the Marines' containment area and detonate their load of explosives as suicide vehicles adjacent to the Marines' billeting areas. 

Force protection was subsequently implemented throughout the Defense Department (and later adopted by the Coast Guard) to ensure that such a scenario never happened to U.S. forces again. Force protection itself is characterized by changing protective tactics to avoid becoming predictable.

See also
 Pentagon Force Protection Agency
Maritime Force Protection Unit
 United States Air Force Security Forces
 Force Protection Condition
 Base defense operations center
 Quick reaction force
 RNZAF Force Protection
 Force Protection Inc

References

Force protection tactics